McKees Rocks may refer to:

Places

 McKees Rocks, Pennsylvania, a borough in Allegheny County

Events

 The 1909 McKees Rocks Strike, also known as the Pressed Steel Car Strike of 1909